Joost Theo Sylvio Yussef Abdelgalil Dowib (born April 14, 1992), known professionally as Josylvio, is a Dutch rapper. Starting his career in 2015, he released his debut studio album, Ma3seb, in 2016, followed by the sophomore album, 2 gezichten, in 2017. Josylvio's third, Hella Cash (2018), fourth, Gimma (2019) and fifth album, Abu Omar (2021), have all topped the Dutch Albums Charts. In 2022, he released his sixth album titled Vallen & Opstaan. Josylvio has received multiple awards during his career, including Edison Award, XITE Award and FunX Music Award.

Life and career
Born in Naarden to a Dutch mother and an Egyptian father, Josylvio started his career in 2015 under the name Jaybay. In 2015, he released the single "Le7nesh" with Sevn Alias. With success of the song, he released his debut album Ma3seb with Dutch hip hop producer Esko. The album reached number five on the Dutch Album Top 100 and earned him an Edison Award nomination. He released a number of singles that reached the Single Top 100, including in collaboration with other rappers, such as Ali B, Hef, Adje, Jairzinho, Kevin and others.

In 2017 Josylvio was featured on the collaborative album All Eyez on Us along with Latifah, Kempi, Sevn Alias, Vic9 and Rocks. The joint album was inspired by the documentary film All Eyez on Me about Tupac Shakur and a tribute to him. And in 2018, Josylvio took part in RTL reality program Expeditie Robinson in its 19th season finishing 18th.

Discography

Albums

Studio albums

Collaborative albums

Compilation albums

Singles

As lead artist

*Did not appear in the official Belgian Ultratop 50 charts, but rather in the bubbling under Ultratip charts.

As featured artist

*Did not appear in the official Belgian Ultratop 50 charts, but rather in the bubbling under Ultratip charts.

Other charted songs

Awards and nominations

References

External links
 Josylvio at AllMusic
 
 

Dutch rappers
1992 births
Living people
People from Naarden
Dutch people of Egyptian descent